Karl "Köping" Gustafsson (16 September 1888 – 20 February 1960) was a Swedish football player who competed at the 1908, 1912 and 1920 Summer Olympics.

Career

Club career
On club level, Gustafsson represented IFK Köping, Köpings IS, Djurgården, Hallstahammar, and Westmannia. He won two Svenska Mästerskapet with Djurgården.

International career
In 1912 he played as midfielder one match in the main tournament as well as one match in the consolation tournament. In the 1920 tournament he was also a part of the Swedish football team, as well as in the 1924 tournament, where he did not play.

In total, Gustafsson made 32 appearances for Sweden and scored 22 goals.

Honours

Club 

 Djurgårdens IF 
 Svenska Mästerskapet (2): 1917, 1920

References

External links

 Swedish squad in 1912
 

1888 births
1960 deaths
Swedish footballers
Sweden international footballers
Djurgårdens IF Fotboll players
Olympic footballers of Sweden
Footballers at the 1908 Summer Olympics
Footballers at the 1912 Summer Olympics
Footballers at the 1920 Summer Olympics
Footballers at the 1924 Summer Olympics
Olympic medalists in football
Association football midfielders
Medalists at the 1924 Summer Olympics
Olympic bronze medalists for Sweden